Ayla Ågren (born 23 July 1993 in Bærum) is a Norwegian-Swedish female racing driver. Representing Norway, she currently competes in the W Series.

Biography
Following a decade in karting across Europe and Scandinavia, Ågren moved to the United States to forge a professional career – first testing with the Skip Barber Racing School and then competing in their Summer Series, scoring four podiums and finishing eighth overall. In 2013, she moved into F1600, immediately proving competitive and winning the championship at her second attempt with a last-lap pass for victory in the final round at Watkins Glen. The success saw her move onto the Road to Indy schedule, promoted within Team Pelfrey. Whilst initially competitive, her first season in U.S. F2000 proved to be her only full campaign as the funding began to dry up. She managed a fourth place at Road America in 2016 having moved to John Cummiskey Racing, but a move back to Team Pelfrey in 2017 led to a half-season campaign with her final appearance at Iowa ending in an eighth-place finish.

Having spent a year out of racing, Ågren applied for the W Series, a European-based Formula 3 championship solely for women, in 2019. She failed to qualify for the inaugural season, and eventually landed a job as the IndyCar safety car driver having given up on finding a race seat. She would again attempt to qualify for the W Series in 2020, and successfully made the 20-car grid on her second attempt before the season was cancelled in response to the COVID-19 pandemic.

Racing record

Career summary

* Season still in progress.

Complete W Series results 
(key) (Races in bold indicate pole position) (Races in italics indicate fastest lap)

* Season still in progress.

References

External links
Profile at Driver Database
Official website

Norwegian racing drivers
1993 births
Living people
W Series drivers
Sportspeople from Bærum
U.S. F2000 National Championship drivers
Team Pelfrey drivers
Bryan Herta Autosport drivers
IndyCar Series people
Le Mans Cup drivers
Swedish female racing drivers
Norwegian female racing drivers